Susan Vera Cooper OBE (29 October 1902 – 28 July 1995) was a prolific English ceramic designer working in the Stoke-on-Trent pottery industries from the 1920s to the 1980s.

Life and work
Born in Burslem, Staffordshire, she was the youngest of seven children. From an early age she developed an interest in drawing, and began her art education by attending night classes at the Burslem School of Art. In 1922 she joined the ceramics firm A. E. Gray & Co. Ltd, partially as a means to gain entry to the Royal College of Art.

A. Edward Gray quickly discovered her talents as a painter and designer, and soon she was producing her hand-painted floral designs. In 1923 A.  E. Gray launched the Gloria Lustre Range employing the technique of lustreware. In 1929, motivated by her desire to design ceramic shapes in addition to decors, she broke away with her brother-in-law Albert "Jack" Beeson to set up her own business, as Susie Cooper Potteries.

She worked for many other pottery firms over the next several decades, including Wedgwood. In 1940 she was awarded Royal Designer for Industry by the Royal Society of Arts, and in 1979 she received an OBE. By all accounts Elizabeth, The Queen Mother was an admirer of her work.

At the age of 80 she retired to live on the Isle of Man, and died there in 1995. Like the Potteries-based ceramic designers Clarice Cliff and Charlotte Rhead, her work has become highly sought after and valued by some pottery collectors.

References

External links

 Susie Cooper Information Site biography, factory history, pottery marks.
 Stoke-on-Trent Museums See Susie Cooper's designs plus the World's Finest Collection of Staffordshire Ceramics.
 Pots designed by Susie Cooper to explore online
 Gray's pottery website Resource website for Gray's Pottery
Royal Designers for Industry & Britain Can Make It
 

1902 births
1995 deaths
English potters
English ceramicists
Alumni of the Royal College of Art
Dinnerware designers
People from Burslem
Alumni of Burslem School of Art
Officers of the Order of the British Empire
Women potters
20th-century ceramists
British women ceramicists